Amagaju Football Club is an association football club from Nyamagabe District Southern Province, Rwanda. The team currently competes in the Rwanda National Football League, and plays its home games at the Stade de Nyamagabe known as Nyagisenyi.

External links
Soccerway

Football clubs in Rwanda